Karnataka State Highway 35, commonly referred to as KA SH 35, is a state highway running from Sidlaghatta (North) to Anekal (South) passing through Hoskote, Kadugodi, Whitefield, Varthur, Gunjur, Sarjapur, Attibele.
Part of it is maintained by the Karnataka Public Works Department and a part by Bruhat Bengaluru Mahanagara Palike.
Majority of the highway is 2-laned, except for the section between Kadugodi and Varthur-Kodi which is 4 laned.

Route description 

SH 35 begins at NH 68 (previously NH 234) in Sidlaghatta and goes southwards to intersect with SH 82 and NH 75 (previously NH 4) at Hoskote.
Southbound, the highway goes over the Bangalore-Chennai Railway line at Kadugodi, intersects with Whitefield road and Varthur Road in Whitefield.
Further south it crosses the Dakshina Pinakini (Ponnaiyar River) at Varthur-Kodi, passes by Varthur Lake and Varthur.
It intersects with Sarjapur Road at Dommasandra then goes southbound till Attibele where it intersects with Hosur Road - NH 44 (previously NH 7).
From there it goes southwest, to end at Anekal after crossing the Bangalore-Hosur Railway line.

Major junctions

National Highways 
NH 75 (formerly NH 4) at Hoskote
NH 44 (formerly NH 7) at Attibele

State Highways 
SH 96 at Jangamakote
SH 82 at Hoskote

Other information 
A portion of the highway between Varthur-Kodi and Hope farm will be a part of the signal-free elevated corridor planned between Vellara junction to Hope farm.

References

See also 
 List of State Highways in Karnataka

State Highways in Karnataka
Roads in Bangalore Rural district
Roads in Bangalore Urban district